Hope Valley is a locality in Alberta, Canada.

Hope Valley was so named on account of the hopeful spirit of the first settlers.

The location in When Calls The Heart is named after this real life location. (In season 1, it was Coal Valley)

References 

Localities in the Municipal District of Wainwright No. 61